Ageostrophy or (ageostrophic flow) is the difference between the actual wind or current and the geostrophic wind or geostrophic current. Since geostrophy is an exact balance between the Coriolis force and the pressure gradient force, ageostrophic flow reflects an imbalance, and thus is often implicated in disturbances, vertical motions (important for weather), and rapid changes with time. Ageostrophic flow reflects the existence of all the other terms in the momentum equation neglected in that idealization, including friction and material acceleration Dv/Dt, which includes the centrifugal force in curved flow.

See also
geostrophic
geostrophic wind

References

External links
Meteo 422 – Lecture 17 – The Omega Equation Aloft

Oceanography

fr:Vent géostrophique#Vent agéostrophique